Nicholas Ridley may refer to:

 Nicholas Ridley (martyr) (died 1555), English clergyman
 Nicholas Ridley-Colborne, 1st Baron Colborne (1779–1854), British politician
 Henry Nicholas Ridley (1855–1956), English botanist
 Nicholas Ridley, Baron Ridley of Liddesdale (1929–1993), British politician